Hensleigh may refer to

Surname
Jonathan Hensleigh (born 1959), American screenwriter and film director

Given name
John Hensleigh Allen (1769–1843), British politician
Hensleigh Wedgwood (1803–1891), British etymologist and philologist